Britt Bonneau (born May 11, 1970) is an American college baseball coach who had been the head coach at Abilene Christian (ACU) from 1997 to the competition of the 2018 season. Under Bonneau, ACU played in nine NCAA Tournaments. Previously, he was an assistant at UTSA, Lubbock Christian, and Abilene Christian. Bonneau played professional baseball in the mid-1990s after playing college baseball at Lubbock Christian and Oklahoma.

Playing career
Bonneau played college baseball at Lubbock Christian (LCU) from 1989 to 1991 and Oklahoma in 1992. At LCU in 1991, he played on an NAIA World Series team and was named a First-Team All-American. At Oklahoma in 1992, he played in the College World Series.

The Chicago Cubs signed Bonneau to a professional contract after college.  He played in the Cubs' minor league system in 1993, advancing as far as short-season Geneva.  He then played independent league baseball in 1994 and 1995 in the Texas–Louisiana League.

Coaching career

Early career
While pursuing his professional playing career during the summers, Bonneau began his coaching career in the spring of 1993. He worked as an assistant at UTSA that year. He then spent 1994 and 1995 at Lubbock Christian, where he completed his bachelor's degree.

Abilene Christian
After his playing career ended at the end of the 1995 season, Bonneau spent the 1996 season as an assistant at Abilene Christian under Jimmy Shankle. That season, the Wildcats qualified for their first NCAA Tournament. Bonneau replaced Shankle as head coach the following season.

After missing the Lone Star Tournament in his first season as head coach, Abilene Christian had six consecutive 40-win seasons from 1998 to 2003.  This included a string of four consecutive NCAA Tournaments from 2000 to 2003 that culminated in a College World Series appearance in 2003.  From 2000 to 2002, the Wildcats won three straight Lone Star South Division and Tournament titles.  It won neither in 2003 but received an at-large bid to the NCAA Tournament.  In the 2003 South Regional, ACU won its first two games, 9–5 over Central Oklahoma and 14–5 over Delta State.  It defeated Delta State again in the regional title game to advance to the College World Series, the program's first.  There, it lost consecutive games to Tampa and UC Davis.  After going 31–25 in 2004, Abilene Christian had another stretch of six straight 40-win seasons that culminated in a 50-win season in 2010.  In that stretch, ACU won another three divisions titles, two conference titles, and two conference tournament titles.

In 2014, Abilene Christian joined Division I. In the Southland Conference, the Wildcats finished 13th after an 18–36 overall season.

On May 19, 2018, Bonneau resigned as the head coach of Abilene Christian. Bonneau now works as a volunteer assistant coach at OU.

Head coaching record
Below is a table of Bonneau's records as a collegiate head baseball coach.

See also
 Abilene Christian Wildcats

References

Living people
1970 births
Abilene Christian Wildcats baseball coaches
Geneva Cubs players
Huntington Cubs players
Lubbock Christian Chaparrals baseball coaches
Lubbock Christian Chaparrals baseball players
Lubbock Crickets players
Oklahoma Sooners baseball players
Tyler Wildcatters players
UTSA Roadrunners baseball coaches
Baseball coaches from Texas
Oklahoma Sooners baseball coaches